Stephen Bowen is the name of:

Stephen Bowen (American football) (born 1984), African-american professional football player
Stephen Bowen (astronaut) (born 1964), American astronaut
Stephen Bowen (biologist), American fish biologist, Dean and CEO of Oxford College of Emory University
Stephen Bowen (politician) (born 1969), American politician from Maine